Maamoul is a filled butter cookie made with semolina flour. The filling can be made with dried fruits like figs or dates or nuts such as pistachios or walnuts and occasionally almonds. 

Maamoul are usually made during the Easter holiday, Purim, and a few days before Eid (then stored to be served with Arabic coffee and chocolate to guests who come during the holiday). It is popular throughout the Arab world, especially in the Arabian peninsula.

They may be in the shape of balls, domed or flattened cookies. They can either be decorated by hand or be made in special wooden moulds called tabe.

Variations

The cookies can be filled with nuts (commonly used nuts are pistachios, almonds or walnuts) or dried fruits, most commonly orange-scented date paste.

In Turkey, maamouls are referred to as Kombe and the filling usually consists of crushed walnuts, ginger and cinnamon.

Etymology 
The Arabic word is derived from the Arabic verb  (meaning to "to do".

Customs 
While ma'amoul are consumed all-year long, they are most associated with Eid Al-Fitr or iftar as meals in celebration for the ending of Ramadan's fasting. For Christian Arabs as well, ma'amoul is also part of the Easter celebrations.

See also

References

Further reading 

 Farah, Madelain, Lebanese Cuisine: More than 200 Simple, Delicious, Authentic Recipes: London: 2001 
 Smouha, Patricia, Middle Eastern Cooking, London 1955 ASIN: B0000CJAHX
 Roden, Claudia, A New Book of Middle Eastern Food: London 1986 
 Roden, Claudia, The Book of Jewish Food: New York 1997, London 1999 
 Uvezian, Sonia, Recipes and Remembrances from an Eastern Mediterranean Kitchen: A Culinary Journey Through Syria, Lebanon, and Jordan: 2004 , 
 Joan Nathan, The Jewish Holiday Kitchen: New York 1988 
 Joan Nathan's Jewish Holiday Cookbook: 2004 ,

External links 
 

Cookies
Hanukkah foods
Lebanese desserts
Levantine cuisine
Mizrahi Jewish cuisine
Rosh Hashanah foods
Sephardi Jewish cuisine
Arab desserts
Stuffed desserts
Arab pastries
Easter food
Semolina dishes
Lenten foods
Jewish cookies